Aheylite is a rare phosphate mineral with formula (Fe2+Zn)Al6[(OH)4|(PO4)2]2·4(H2O). It occurs as pale blue to pale green triclinic crystal masses.  Aheylite was made the newest member of the turquoise group in 1984 by International Mineralogical Association Commission on New Minerals and Mineral Names.

Composition
The turquoise group has a basic formula of A0-1B6(PO4)4−x(PO3OH)x(OH)8·4H2O. This group contains five other minerals. In addition to aheylite: planerite, turquoise, faustite, chalcosiderite, and an unnamed Fe2+-Fe3+ analogue.  Aheylite is distinguished in this group by having Fe2+ dominant in the A-site. The ideal aheylite has a formula of Fe2+Al6(PO4)4(OH)8·4H2O. Its color is pale blue or green. With turquoise family the blue color is said to come from the octahedral coordination of Cu2+ in the absence of Fe3+.

Name and discovery
It was first described for an occurrence in the Huanuni mine, Huanuni, Oruro Department, Bolivia, and named for Allen V. Heyl (1918–2008), an economic geologist for the United States Geological Survey. It was discovered by Eugene Foord and Joseph Taggart.

Occurrence
In addition to the type locality in Bolivia it has been reported from the Bali Lo prospect in the Capricorn Range, Western Australia and the Les Montmins Mine, Auvergne, France.
It is a turquoise group mineral and occurs as a late hydrothermal phase in a tin deposit associated with variscite, vivianite, wavellite, cassiterite, sphalerite, pyrite and quartz in the type locality.

Physical properties
It is found as an isolated mass of hemispheres and spheres clumped together. It has a vitreous to dull luster. It has a hackly to splintery fracture and it has a brittle tenacity. The hardness is about 5-5.5, and the specific gravity is 2.84. As far as optical properties, it had thin flakes; ipale blue, green to blue-green color; it streaks white, and has a subvitreous luster.

References 

Phosphate minerals
Triclinic minerals